Skyler Stonestreet is an American musician and singer-songwriter based in Los Angeles, California.  She is a writer on hit tracks such as Ariana Grande & Justin Bieber's "Stuck With U", The Chainsmokers' "Kanye", Dua Lipa's “IDGAF”, Tate McRae & Jeremy Zucker's "That Way," Hailee Steinfeld's "Wrong Direction" Marshmello's "Chasing Colors", Lennon Stella's "Older Than I Am", Dove Cameron's "Boyfriend" and many more.  As a writer and a featured vocalist Skyler can be heard on tracks from acts such as Seven Lions' "Freesol" and Cheat Codes and Nicky Romero's "Sober".

Career 
Skyler Stonestreet was in a competition for Rolling Stone to become the first ever unsigned artist to be on the cover. After making it to the final eight, she wrote a song called "Polaroid" which became part of the campaign for the new Z340 Polaroid Camera and debuted on Polaroid.com. Rolling Stone has described her music as, "Flirty pop, full of bells, finger snaps and breathy vocals."

Her music has been featured on Grey's Anatomy (ABC), One Tree Hill (CW), Jane By Design (ABC Family), Switched At Birth (ABC family), Royal Pains (USA), Ghost Whisperer (CBS), Make It or Break It (ABC Family), Against the Wall (Lifetime), Spotlight 25 (Lifetime) as well as on MTV, VH1 and Oxygen.

Credits

References

Year of birth missing (living people)
Living people
American women songwriters
21st-century American women